Path of Democracy is a political group and think tank established in 2015 in Hong Kong. It is led by former Civic Party legislator Ronny Tong, who joined the Executive Council on 1 July 2017. Although officially unaligned with either the pro-Beijing camp or the pro-democracy camp, the group has been supportive of the policies and legislation put forward by the former.

Beliefs
The group states that it seeks to maximise democratic development within the limits of the "one country, two systems" principle of Hong Kong people ruling Hong Kong and a high degree of autonomy, by a moderate approach, which includes:
 To consolidate the majority of supporters of the democratic camp in the society;
 To promote a moderate political approach in a proactive manner, and to carve out new political horizon in the society;
 To formulate agenda and construct systematic political discourse;
 To establish new ideological dimensions in the politics, society, economics and culture of the Hong Kong Special Administrative Region together with different stakeholders through research, dialogue and engagement.
In September 2022, it lobbied the government to:

 Enact laws against "fake news",
 Provide HK$5000/month in housing subsidies to mainland Chinese students who graduate from a Hong Kong university and wish to settle in Hong Kong,
 Offer "professional development courses" to Hong Kong teachers to be trained in mainland China, and
 To introduce Simplified Chinese in schools, verses the current Traditional Chinese

Background
Path of Democracy was founded by Ronny Tong Ka-wah, a barrister, the founding member of the pro-democracy Civic Party, and member of Legislative Council, who was disillusioned with pan-democrats' uncompromising approach toward Beijing on democratic reform. Tong came up with his own moderate proposal in October 2013 as opposed to pan-democrats' Alliance for True Democracy proposal. Tong's proposal failed to be adopted by the government as the National People's Congress Standing Committee (NPCSC) set limits on the electoral reform on 31 August 2014 which eventually led to the ultimate veto by the pan-democrats in the Legislative Council in June 2015, in which Tong voted against the proposal with the Civic Party. On 8 June 2015, before the vote, he set up a think tank Path of Democracy, composed of moderate democrats. After the vote, he announced his resignation from both the Civic Party and the Legislative Council.

The group was set up on 8 June 2015 with 18 founding members from a wide range of sectors, including political science professors Joseph Cho Wai Chan and Ray Yep Kin-man who would conduct research. Former Secretary for Civil Service Joseph Wong Wing-ping, barrister Jat Sew-tong, Centaline founder Shih Wing-ching, businessman Allan Zeman were the four honorary advisers to the think tank. Scholars Cheung Chor-yung and Derek Yuen became the Secretary General and Chief Executive Officer of the group. Other members included former chairman of the Hong Kong Democratic Foundation Alan Lung, economists Sung Yun-wing and Richard Wong and Southern District Councillor Paul Zimmerman.

It was reported that it would field three candidates, co-convenor Joseph Lau Pui-wing, and governors Gary Wong Chi-him and Raymond Mak Ka-chun, in the 2016 Legislative Council election.

Performance in elections

Legislative council elections

See also
Third Side
Civic Party
Professional Power

References

External links
 Path of Democracy Website

2015 establishments in Hong Kong
Political parties in Hong Kong
Think tanks based in Hong Kong